Rubus coriifolius is a Mesoamerican species of brambles in the rose family. It grows in central and southern Mexico (from Chiapas as far north as Tamaulipas) and Central America (Guatemala, Honduras, Nicaragua).

Rubus coriifolius is a perennial up to 2 meters tall, with hairs and sometimes a few small prickles. Leaves are compound with 3 or 5 thick, leathery leaflets. Flowers are white or rose-colored. Fruits are red or almost black.

References

External links
photo of herbarium specimen at Missouri Botanical Garden, collected in Guatemala in 1892

coriifolius
Flora of Mexico
Flora of Central America
Plants described in 1839